Cabuyao is a city in Laguna, Philippines.

Cabuyao may also refer to:
 Cabuyao (fruit), common name for Citrus macroptera, a species of wild orange
 Cabuyao railway station, a station of Philippine National Railways
 Cabuyao University, Pamantasan ng Cabuyao,  in the Philippines

Others
 Cabuyao local elections, 2013, local elections in the city of Cabuyao, Philippines held in 2013
 Cabuyao City Council, city council of the city of Cabuyao in the Philippines.